Ahn Gyu-back (born 29 April 1961) is a South Korean politician in the liberal Minjoo Party of Korea. He has been a member of the National Assembly for Dongdaemun, Seoul, since 2012, and previously served as a party list member from 2008 to 2012.

Ahn was appointed deputy floor leader of the New Politics Alliance for Democracy, the Minjoo Party's predecessor, on 12 October 2014, and remained in that position for seven months. He was praised by his Saenuri Party counterpart, Cho Hae-jin, who described him as having an "honest and upright" character and "always thinking of his country first". He subsequently became head of strategy and public relations for the NPAD on 23 June 2015.

A ranking member of the Assembly's National Defense Committee, Ahn has been a critic of South Korea's defense policy. In 2011 he stated that draft-dodging had doubled under the Lee Myung-bak administration, and at the end of 2015 he attacked Park Geun-hye's government for signing an intelligence cooperation agreement with Japan and the United States, stating that "it is against all reason to give [Korea's] advanced information" to Japan given its colonial history in the peninsula and continuing territorial claims over the Liancourt Rocks. In June 2015, he introduced a bill to honor the veterans of the Second Battle of Yeonpyeong, an armed confrontation with North Korea that had taken place in 2002.

Born in Gochang County in North Jeolla, Ahn attended high school in Gwangju, and studied Eastern philosophy at Sungkyunkwan University as an undergraduate before earning a master's degree at the university's Department of Commerce and Trade.

Notes

References

1961 births
Living people
Members of the National Assembly (South Korea)
Minjoo Party of Korea politicians
People from Gochang County
Sungkyunkwan University alumni
South Korean Buddhists